KLW or klw can refer to:

Kaliwedi railway station,  West Java, Indonesia - see List of railway stations in Indonesia#West Java (station code: KLW)
Klawock Airport, Alaska (IATA airport code: KLW)
Knoxville Locomotive Works, a United States railway locomotive manufacturer
Kulpi railway station, West Bengal, India (Indian railways station code: KLW)
Lindu language, an Austronesian language spoken in Indonesia (ISO-639-3 code: klw)